William Wharton may refer to:
William H. Wharton (1802–1839), American colonist, political leader, diplomat, Senator and orator
William Wharton (Royal Navy officer) (1843–1905), British admiral and Hydrographer of the Navy 1884-1904
William F. Wharton (1847–1919), American attorney who served as the United States Assistant Secretary of State
William Wharton (author) (1925–2008), American author, pen name of Albert William Du Aime
William P. Wharton (1880–1976), president of the National Parks Association 1935-53
 William Wharton, the villain from the novel The Green Mile by Stephen King